Prosper Portland, formerly the Portland Development Commission (PDC), is the community development corporation created by the city of Portland, Oregon. It promotes development, housing projects and economic development within the city's eleven urban renewal districts.

It has controversially sought to establish measurable standards for workplace diversity among its contractors.

In May 2017, the Portland City Council voted to change PDC's name to Prosper Portland.

References

External links

Government of Portland, Oregon
Organizations based in Portland, Oregon